Baker Township may refer to:

 Baker Township, Izard County, Arkansas
 Baker Township, Lafayette County, Arkansas
 Baker Township, Randolph County, Arkansas
 Baker Township, Morgan County, Indiana
 Baker Township, Guthrie County, Iowa
 Baker Township, O'Brien County, Iowa
 Baker Township, Osceola County, Iowa
 Baker Township, Crawford County, Kansas
 Baker Township, Gove County, Kansas
 Baker Township, Stevens County, Minnesota

Township name disambiguation pages